Cythara diconus is a species of sea snail, a marine gastropod mollusk in the family Mangeliidae.

This species is considered a nomen dubium.

Description

Distribution
This marine species occurs off the Philippines.

References

 Boettger, O. "Die marinen Mollusken der Philippinen (IV) nach den Sammlungen des Herrn José Florencio Quadra in Manila. IV. Die Pleurotomiden." Nachrichtsblatt der Deutschen Malakozoologischen Gesellschaft 27 (1895): 41–63

External links
  Tucker, J.K. 2004 Catalog of recent and fossil turrids (Mollusca: Gastropoda). Zootaxa 682: 1–1295.

diconus
Gastropods described in 1895